Selkirk was a royal burgh that returned one commissioner to the Parliament of Scotland and to the Convention of Estates.

After the Acts of Union 1707, Selkirk, Lanark, Linlithgow and Peebles formed the Lanark district of burghs, returning one member between them to the House of Commons of Great Britain.

List of burgh commissioners

 1661: Robert Elliot, bailie   
 1665 convention, 1667 convention: William Michilhill, bailie 
 1669–74: Patrick Murray  
 1678 convention, 1685–86: William Wauch, bailie 
 1681–82: Andro Angus, town clerk 
 1689 convention, 1689–1702: John Murray 
 1702–07: Robert Scott

See also
 List of constituencies in the Parliament of Scotland at the time of the Union

References

Constituencies of the Parliament of Scotland (to 1707)
Selkirkshire
Constituencies disestablished in 1707
1707 disestablishments in Scotland